Richard Jackson (born 31 March 1932) was a British theatrical agent and play producer from 1959 until retiring in 2003.

Early life
He was educated at Cheltenham College 1945–48, and after completing his National Service was employed by Walt Disney Productions Ltd from 1956 - 1958.

Awards and recognition
Life member of BAFTA
Officier de l’Ordre des Arts et des Lettres, 1993.

Early career
He was Company Manager for Lindsay Kemp's "Pierrot in Turquoise" featuring David Bowie (Mercury Theatre and Tour) 1967.

Productions
Jock-on-the-Go (Jeanetta Cochrane Theatre) 1973.
Chox - Cambridge Footlights Revue (Comedy Theatre) 1974.
Peter Pan Man (Kings Head) 1975.
The Polynesian Prime Minister with Vikki Richards 1975.
Charles Trenet in Concert (Royal Albert Hall) 1975.
Madame de Sade (Kings Head) 1975.
Jade (Kings Head) with Annie Ross 1975.
Carol's Christmas (Kings Head) with Nigel Stock and Prunella Gee 1975.
The Bitter Tears of Petra Von Kant (New End) 1976, with Delphine Seyrig.
Better Days, Better Knights (Kings Head) 1976.
Blind Date (King's Head) with Julia Foster and Nigel Hawthorne 1977.
Oedipus at the Crossroads (King's Head) with Nicky Henson and Raymond Westwell 1977.
Like Dolls or Angels (King's Head) with Prunella Gee and Rupert Frazer 1977.
An Evening with Quentin Crisp (Duke of Yorks and Ambassadors) 1978.
The Singular Life of Albert Nobbs with Susannah York, Julia Foster and Stephanie Beacham.
A Tribute to Lili Lamont (New End) with Gloria Grahame and Don Fellows 1978.
Flashpoint (New End and Mayfair)1978.
A Day in Hollywood. A Night in Ukraine (New End and Mayfair, which received the Evening Standard Award for Best Musical and Plays and Players Award for Best Comedy, 1979.
The Square with Angela Pleasence/La Musica with Estelle Kohler (double bill), 1979
Portrait of Dora (New End) 1979.
Appearances (Mayfair) with Susannah York and Daniel Massey, 1980.
A Galway Girl (Lyric Studio) 1980.
Latin with Simon Russell Beale (Lyric Studio) 1983.
The Human Voice with Susannah York, performed World-wide 1984-92.
Swimming Pools At War with Prunella Gee and Mary Tamm (Offstage) 1985.
Matthew, Mark, Luke and Charlie (Latchmere) 1986.
I Ought to be in Pictures (Offstage) 1986.
Pier Paola Pasolini (Offstage) 1987.
Creditors/Latin (New End - double bill) 1989.
Beached (Old Red Lion) 1990.
Hamlet with Kevin Doyle and Susannah York (Howarth Festival USA) 1990.
Eden Cinema (Offstage) with Doreen Mantle, Julia Foster and Emma Rice). Winner of the Peter Brook Empty Space Award 1991.
Noonbreak with Susannah York (French Institute) 1991.
Beardsley (Offstage) 1992.
Don't Play with Love (French Institute and Rudolf Steiner House) 1992.
Play with Cocaine (New Grove) 1993.
The Eagle Has Two Heads with Lisa Harrow (Lilian Baylis) 1994.
Happy Days with Angela Pleasence (French Institute) 1994.
The Star-Spangled Girl (Latchmere) 1994.
Suzanna Andler with Susan Hampshire and Bryony Brind (BAC) 1995
Independent State with Susannah York (Latchmere and Australian Tour) 1995. 
The First Years/ Beginnings (Latchmere) 1995. 
Last Legs (Latchmere) 1995.
This Wretched Splendour (Latchmere) 1998.
Eugene Onegin (White Bear) 1999.
An Evening For Quentin Crisp (Drill Hall) 2000.
Marry Me You Idiot with Lynda Bellingham and Jacki Piper (Jermyn Street) 2002.
The Loves of Shakespeare's Women devised and performed by Susannah York (Jermyn Street) 2003.

References

British theatre managers and producers
Officiers of the Ordre des Arts et des Lettres
British talent agents
1932 births
Living people